EMI Music Publishing Malaysia Sdn. Bhd. is a subsidiary of the defunct EMI Group. This record
company produced P. Ramlee, Sharifah Aini, Sudirman Arshad and many more.

History
EMI Music Malaysia has become part of the Universal Music Group since 2014. EMI Music Malaysia releases are distributed by Universal Music Sdn. Bhd. The publishing unit EMI Music Publishing Malaysia Sdn. Bhd have become part of Sony ATV.

Artist
List of all artists who have been within the company, including former artists and those who have died:

A
 Ahmad Jais
 Aman Shah
 Ahmad Nawab
 Aishah
 Anita Sarawak

C
 Carefree (Malaysian pop band)

D
 D. J. Dave

E
 Ella

F
 Fazidah Joned
 Fauziah Latiff

G
 Gaya Zakry

H
 Habibah Yaakub
 Halil Chik
 Hail Amir
 Herman Tino
 Hakim Ahmad

I
 Ismail Haron

J
 Jennifer Yen
 Junainah M. Amin

K
 Kartina Dahari
 Kamariah Noor

L
 Latif Ibrahim

M
 Maria Menado

N
 Normadiah
 Nona Asiah
 Noorkumalasari

P
 P. Ramlee

R
 Rozita Rohaizad
 Rosemaria
 Rafeah Buang
 Rose Iskandar

S
 Saloma
 Sarena Hashim
 Sanisah Huri
 Sharifah Aini
 Sudirman Arshad
 Sheila Abdul
 Sheila Majid

U
 Uji Rashid

Z
 Ziana Zain
 Zaleha Hamid

See also
 List of EMI labels

References

Defunct companies of Malaysia
Malaysian record labels
Defunct record labels
EMI
Companies disestablished in 2014
2014 disestablishments in Malaysia
Malaysian subsidiaries of foreign companies